TVW may refer to:

Television 
 TVW, an Australian television channel
 TVW (Washington), an American television channel in Washington state
 TVW (WISC-TV), an American television channel in Wisconsin
 KTVW-DT, an American television channel in Arizona
 WTVW, an American television station in Indiana

Other uses 
 TeamViewer
 Sedoa language